In mathematics, more specifically complex analysis, the residue is a complex number proportional to the contour integral of a meromorphic function along a path enclosing one of its singularities. (More generally, residues can be calculated for any function  that is holomorphic except at the discrete points {ak}k, even if some of them are essential singularities.) Residues can be computed quite easily and, once known, allow the determination of general contour integrals via the residue theorem.

Definition 

Alternatively, residues can be calculated by finding Laurent series expansions, and one can define the residue as the coefficient a−1 of a Laurent series.

The definition of a residue can be generalized to arbitrary Riemann surfaces. Suppose  is a 1-form on a Riemann surface.

Examples

Residue of a monomial 
Computing the residue of a monomial

makes most residue computations easy to do. Since path integral computations are homotopy invariant, we will let  be the circle with radius . Then, using the change of coordinates  we find that

 

hence our integral now reads as

Application of monomial residue 
As an example, consider the contour integral

where C is some simple closed curve about 0.

Let us evaluate this integral using a standard convergence result about integration by series. We can substitute the Taylor series for  into the integrand. The integral then becomes

Let us bring the 1/z5 factor into the series. The contour integral of the series then writes

 

Since the series converges uniformly on the support of the integration path, we are allowed to exchange integration and summation.  
The series of the path integrals then collapses to a much simpler form because of the previous computation. So now the integral around C of every other term not in the form cz−1 is zero, and the integral is reduced to

 

The value 1/4! is the residue of ez/z5 at z = 0, and is denoted

Calculating residues 
Various methods exist for calculating this value, and the choice of which method to use depends on the function in question, and on the nature of the singularity.

According to the residue theorem, we have:

 

where γ traces out a circle around c in a counterclockwise manner. We may choose the path γ to be a circle of radius ε around c, where ε is as small as we desire. This may be used for calculation in cases where the integral can be calculated directly, but it is usually the case that residues are used to simplify calculation of integrals, and not the other way around.

Removable singularities
If the function f can be continued to a holomorphic function on the whole disk , then Res(f, c) = 0. The converse is not generally true.

Simple poles
At a simple pole c, the residue of f is given by:

If that limit does not exist, there is an essential singularity there. If it is 0 then it is either analytic there or there is a removable singularity. If it is equal to infinity then the order is higher than 1.

It may be that the function f can be expressed as a quotient of two functions, where g and h are holomorphic functions in a neighbourhood of c, with h(c) = 0 and h'''(c) ≠ 0. In such a case, L'Hôpital's rule can be used to simplify the above formula to:

 

Limit formula for higher-order poles
More generally, if c is a pole of order n, then the residue of f around z = c'' can be found by the formula:

 

This formula can be very useful in determining the residues for low-order poles. For higher-order poles, the calculations can become unmanageable, and series expansion is usually easier. For essential singularities, no such simple formula exists, and residues must usually be taken directly from series expansions.

Residue at infinity
In general, the residue at infinity is defined as:

 

If the following condition is met:

then the residue at infinity can be computed using the following formula:

If instead

then the residue at infinity is

For holomorphic functions the sum of the residues at the isolated singularities plus the residue at infinity is zero.

Series methods 
If parts or all of a function can be expanded into a Taylor series or Laurent series, which may be possible if the parts or the whole of the function has a standard series expansion, then calculating the residue is significantly simpler than by other methods.

See also
 The residue theorem relates a contour integral around some of a function's poles to the sum of their residues
 Cauchy's integral formula
 Cauchy's integral theorem
 Mittag-Leffler's theorem
 Methods of contour integration
 Morera's theorem
 Partial fractions in complex analysis

References

External links 
 
 

Meromorphic functions